Post-irony (from Latin post "after" and Ancient Greek  , "dissimulation, feigned ignorance") is a term used to denote a state in which earnest and ironic intents become muddled. It may less commonly refer to its converse: a return from irony to earnestness, similar to New Sincerity. Noted surreal humor comedian Tim Heidecker portrays a man living a post-ironic lifestyle in the 2012 indie drama film The Comedy.

In literature, David Foster Wallace is often described as the founder of a "postironic" literature. His essays "E Unibus Pluram" and "Fictional Futures and the Conspicuously Young" describe and hope for a literature that goes beyond postmodern irony. Other authors often described as postironic are Dave Eggers, Tao Lin, and Alex Shakar.

Overview
Whereas in postmodern irony, something is meant to be cynically mocked and not taken seriously, and in New Sincerity, something is meant to be taken seriously or "unironically", post-irony combines these two elements by either having something absurd taken seriously or be unclear as to whether something is meant to be ironic.

One example given is the film The Bad Lieutenant: Port of Call New Orleans:

A central element of post-irony is the obfuscation, ambiguity, watering-down, degradation, or simple lack of meaning and intent in statements and artwork, and whether the creator or disseminator intends this to be celebrated, decried, or met apathetically can itself be part of this uncertainty. As journalist Dmitry Lisovsky writes, "Post-ironic memes [...] don’t even have to be of great quality: I once took 10 random pictures from a few post-ironic meme communities and shuffled the captions between them. Users had a hard time telling the difference between the new ones and those that came before."  Post-irony, meta-irony, and the often vague deconstruction and reconstruction of irony in general, are common elements in millennial and zoomer humor. Post-irony has been stated to be utilized in internet memes to spread disinformation and as a tool to radicalize people into extremist communities, especially relating to the American alt-right  and related movements.

Criticism

In the early aughts, Zoe Williams described the increasing popularity of the term with disapproval:

See also
 Dogwhistling
 Gaslighting
 Guerilla ontology
 Metamodernism
 Poe's Law
 Independent film

References

External links 
Hirschorn, Michael. "Diary" Slate Magazine
Shaviro, Steven. “Prophecies of the Present,” Socialism and Democracy, vol. 24, no.2
Sincerity, Not Irony, Is Our Age's Ethos - The Atlantic

Irony
Criticism of postmodernism